4th New York Film Critics Circle Awards
January 3, 1939

Best Picture: 
 The Citadel 
The 4th New York Film Critics Circle Awards, announced on 3 January 1939, honored the best filmmaking of 1938.

Winners

Best Picture 
The Citadel
Runner-up – The Lady Vanishes

Best Director
Alfred Hitchcock – The Lady Vanishes
Runner-up – Garson Kanin - A Man to Remember

Best Actor
James Cagney – Angels with Dirty Faces
Runner-up – Spencer Tracy - Boys Town

Best Actress
Margaret Sullavan – Three Comrades
Runner-up – Wendy Hiller – Pygmalion

Best Foreign Film
 Grand Illusion
Runner-up –  Professor Mamlock

Special Award
Walt Disney – Snow White and the Seven Dwarfs

External links
1938 Awards

New York Film Critics Circle Awards
New York Film Critics Circle Awards
New York Film Critics Circle Awards
New York Film Critics Circle Awards
New York Film Critics Circle Awards